The Crete Golf Club a golf course in Greece. It hosts such tournaments as the Aegean Airlines ProAM and the annual International Diaspora Tournament.

References
https://web.archive.org/web/20080120150421/http://www.crete-golf.com/
https://web.archive.org/web/20160109163953/http://golf-in-crete.com/

Golf clubs and courses in Greece